This is a list of tomato dishes. This list includes dishes in which the main ingredient or one of the essential ingredients is tomato. Dishes prepared with tomato sauces as a primary ingredient are not included in this list.

Tomato dishes

See also

 Canned tomato
 Ketchup
 List of fruit dishes
 List of tomato cultivars
 List of vegetable dishes
 Sun-dried tomato
 Tomato jam
 Tomato paste
 Tomato purée
 Tomato sauce

References

 
Tomato